In 3D computer graphics, Schlick’s approximation, named after Christophe Schlick, is a formula for approximating the contribution of the Fresnel factor in the specular reflection of light from a non-conducting interface (surface) between two media.

According to Schlick’s model, the specular reflection coefficient R can be approximated by:
 where 
where  is the angle between the direction from which the incident light is coming and the normal of the interface between the two media, hence . In computer graphics, one of the interfaces is usually air, meaning that  very well can be approximated as 1.

In microfacet models it is assumed that there is always a perfect reflection, but the normal changes according to a certain distribution, resulting in a non-perfect overall reflection. When using Schlick’s approximation, the normal in the above computation is replaced by the halfway vector. Either the viewing or light direction can be used as the second vector.

See also

 Phong reflection model
 Blinn-Phong shading model
 Fresnel equations

References

3D computer graphics